Payback is a 1995 crime film directed by Anthony Hickox and written by Sam Bernard. It stars C. Thomas Howell and Joan Severance.

Plot 
Oscar Bonsetter tells a dying prisoner that he will take revenge on the sadistic guard who killed him. In exchange, Oscar is told of a stash of money. Oscar is eventually released from prison but when he goes to get his revenge, he gets sidetracked by the now blind guard and his beautiful wife, Rose. Rose hates her life, and when someone shows her some attention, she jumps at it eventually. The tension builds as Oscar becomes more and more attracted to Rose.

Cast
 C. Thomas Howell as Oscar Bonsetter
 Joan Severance as Rose Gullerman
 Marshall Bell as Tom "Gully" Gullerman
 Richard Burgi as Al Keegan
 R. G. Armstrong as Mac
 David Anthony Higgins as Jim Koval
 Lisa Robin Kelly as Teenage Girl

References

External links
 
 

1995 films
1990s English-language films
American independent films
American neo-noir films
1995 thriller films
Films directed by Anthony Hickox
Films scored by Anthony Marinelli
1995 independent films
1990s American films